Jackson Blacksmith Shop is a historic blacksmith shop located near Goochland, Goochland County, Virginia.  It was built in 1932, and is a one-story, rectangular, pole structure, shed-type building.  It measures 16 feet by 24 feet and has a gable roof.  The shop remains in operation.

It was listed on the National Register of Historic Places in 1997.

References

External links
Jackson Blacksmith Shop website

Blacksmith shops
Commercial buildings on the National Register of Historic Places in Virginia
Commercial buildings completed in 1932
Buildings and structures in Goochland County, Virginia
National Register of Historic Places in Goochland County, Virginia